Oluwafunmilayo Kemi Jimoh (born May 29, 1984, in Seattle, Washington), commonly known as Funmi Jimoh, is an American long jumper, who competed at the 2008 Summer Olympics.

Jimoh competed for Rice University. At Rice, Jimoh competed in both the long jump and sprinting events, such as the 100 meter hurdles. She jumped 22 feet ¾ inch (6.72 meters) in July 2008 in Eugene, Oregon to place third at the U.S. Olympic Trials to qualify for the 2008 Summer Olympics in Beijing.

At the Olympics, Jimoh jumped 6.61 meters in the qualifying round of the women's long jump. That distance tied for ninth in qualifying and earned Jimoh a place in the final. Jimoh placed twelfth in the final, with a jump of 6.29 meters.

During 2009 World Championships in Berlin Jimoh placed 21st in qualifying with a jump of 6.34 meters and failed to make the final. During 2011 World Championships Jimoh placed 12th and 13th 2013 World Championships.

Her personal best is 6.96 meters which she achieved in Doha on 8 May 2009.

References

External links

 
 
 NBC Olympics Bio
 Funmi Jimoh's blog
 Rice University profile

1984 births
Living people
American female long jumpers
Rice Owls women's track and field athletes
Rice University alumni
African-American female track and field athletes
Athletes (track and field) at the 2008 Summer Olympics
Olympic track and field athletes of the United States
American people of Yoruba descent
American sportspeople of Nigerian descent
Yoruba sportswomen
USA Indoor Track and Field Championships winners
21st-century African-American sportspeople
21st-century African-American women
20th-century African-American people
20th-century African-American women